Herzekiah Andrew Shanu (1858 – July 1905) was an African photographer notably recognized for his involvement in the campaign against inhumane abuses in the Congo Free State.

Early years
He was a Yoruba man, originally from Lagos in what is now Nigeria. He initially became a school teacher. He was educated at the Church Missionary Society Grammar School, and later in the Training Institute for Teachers, at the end of which he graduated as a teacher. For a few years, he taught at a Lagos Primary School. However, in 1884, he entered the colonial service of the Congo Free State as a clerk, rising to the rank of district sub-commissioner and a French-English translator in the office of the governor-general in Boma. Establishing himself at Boma, then the capital, he opened a general store and photographic studio. In 1894, he traveled to Antwerp to attend the Exposition Internationale d'Anvers. Some of his photographs were published in Le Congo illustré. In 1900 he demonstrated his loyalty to the Congo Free State by supporting the authorities during a mutiny by the Force Publique.

Education 
Herzekiah Andrew Shanu was educated at the Church Missionary Society Grammar School, and later in the Training Institute for Teachers, at the end of which he graduated as a teacher. For a few years, he taught at a Lagos Primary School. However, in 1884, he entered the colonial service of the Congo Free State as a clerk.

Activism
In 1903 Shanu supplied Roger Casement with information concerning the abuse of West African workers in the Congo, who in turn referred him to E. D. Morel. Morel and Shanu exchanged messages for several years; Shanu forwarding, among other things, trial transcripts of trials against low-ranking Congo Free State officials which proved to be very revealing. While trying to acquire information from the police chief of Boma, Shanu was found out and as a consequence beleaguered by state officials. After it was discovered that Shanu had provided the Congo Reform Association with evidence of atrocities in Congo, government employees were ordered to boycott his businesses. He suffered bankruptcy and committed suicide in July 1905.

References
Christraud M. Geary, In and Out of Focus: Images from Central Africa, 1885–1960. London: Philip Wilson for Palgrave Macmillan, 2002, pp. 104–106.
"Kinshasa Photographers, 1870 to 2000", Revue Noire, 2001. .

External links
Information about Shanu from the National Museum of African Art.

1858 births
1905 suicides
19th-century Nigerian educators
19th-century photographers
19th-century translators
CMS Grammar School, Lagos alumni
Congo Free State officials
Educators from Lagos
French–English translators
Nigerian expatriates in the Democratic Republic of the Congo
Nigerian human rights activists
Nigerian photographers
Nigerian schoolteachers
People from colonial Nigeria
Portrait photographers
Suicides in the Democratic Republic of the Congo
Yoruba activists
Yoruba businesspeople
Yoruba educators
Yoruba photographers